Malcolm Robertson (1877–1951) was a British diplomat and politician.

Malcolm Robertson may also refer to

 Malcolm Robertson (actor), Australian actor and theatre director, winner of the Kenneth Myer Medallion for the Performing Arts in 2000
 Malcolm Robertson (footballer) (1951–2010), Scottish footballer
 Malcolm Robertson (rower), Australian rower

See also
 Robertson (surname)